Willem van de Velde the Younger (18 December 1633 (baptised)6 April 1707) was a Dutch marine painter, the son of Willem van de Velde the Elder, who also specialised in maritime art. His brother, Adriaen van de Velde, was a landscape painter.

Biography
Willem van de Velde was baptised on 18 December 1633 in Leiden, Holland, Dutch Republic. He was instructed by his father, and around 1650 by Simon de Vlieger, a marine painter of repute at the time, who worked around Weesp. He was also influenced by the work of the Dutch artist Jan van de Cappelle, who excelled at painting cloudy skies, the clouds often being reflected in the calm waters. 

Willem was married twice, in 1652 with Petronella Le Maire coming from Weesp, but divorced. At that time he lived at Buitenkant and likely with a view on the harbour and the Amsterdam Admiralty; from 1655 one of his neighbors was Michiel de Ruyter. In 1656 he married Magdalena Walravens, the daughter of a skipper. The couple had four children and the last one was baptized at Zuiderkerk in 1674. He achieved great celebrity by his art before he came to London. 

The younger Van de Velde collaborated with his father, an experienced draughtsman, who prepared studies of the battles, events and seascapes in black and white (ink paintings), while the son used oil paints. Father and son were driven from the Netherlands by the political and economic conditions which resulted from war with the French, and moved to England. Here they were engaged by Charles II, both at a salary of £100, the Younger to aid his father in "taking and making draughts of sea-fights", his part of the work being to reproduce in color the drawings of the elder Van de Velde. He was also patronized by the Duke of York and by various members of the nobility.

He died on 6 April 1707 in Westminster, England, and was buried at St James's Church, Piccadilly. A memorial to him and his father lies within the church.

Works

Most of Van de Velde's finest works represent views off the coast of Holland, with Dutch shipping. His best productions are delicate, spirited and finished in handling, and correct in the drawing of the vessels and their rigging. The numerous figures are tellingly introduced, and the artist is successful in his renderings of sea, whether in calm or storm. The ships are portrayed with almost photographic accuracy, and are the most precise guides available to the appearance of 17th-century ships.

Substantial collections of Van de Velde's paintings and drawings are held in the National Gallery, National Maritime Museum and the Wallace Collection, all in London; the Rijksmuseum in Amsterdam; and the National Gallery of Art in Washington DC.

References

Gallery

External links 

 
 

1633 births
1707 deaths
Artists from Leiden
Dutch Golden Age painters
Dutch male painters
Dutch marine artists
Sibling artists
Burials at St James's Church, Piccadilly